Brazger valley is a valley in Kurdistan Region, Iraq. It hosts the town of Sidekan. The villages in this valley are: Bnawanok (بنەوانۆک), Harun (هارون), Bermiza (بەرمیزە) and Chnar (چنار), Ênamsid (ئێنەمسید).

Gallery 

Geography of Iraqi Kurdistan
Valleys of Asia